The 52nd TV Week Logie Awards ceremony was held on Sunday 2 May 2010 at the Crown Palladium in Melbourne, and broadcast on the Nine Network. The ceremony was hosted by Bert Newton, making it the 19th time he hosted the event as a solo host. The red carpet arrivals were hosted by Karl Stefanovic, Lisa Wilkinson, Jules Lund and Ruby Rose, while Richard Wilkins and Natalie Gruzlewski presented the Myer Logie Minute during the ceremony. The Big Bang Theorys Johnny Galecki was one of the international guests. Musical performers at the event were John Mayer, Gabriella Cilmi with the cast from the stage musical Fame, k.d. lang and the Rogue Traders. John Foreman returned as musical director for the event. Susan Boyle was scheduled to perform but pulled out a few weeks before the ceremony, cancelling all her appearances in Australia. PJ Lane sang a tribute to his late father Don Lane. Early that year, Each network is restricted in the number of personalities and programs they can submit for consideration in the publicly voted category, including up to 10 names in both the Most Popular Actor and Actress categories, 15 names for Most Popular Presenter and 5 programs for Most Popular Drama. These restrictions often lead to controversy over those who are not listed in the voting form, and are not eligible to be nominated for an award.

Nominations
The traditional Logies nominations breakfast was held on 29 March 2010 at the Ivy Pool Bar in Sydney. The breakfast was hosted by Charlie Pickering and Gigi Edgley. Both Sunrise, The Morning Show and Today crossed to the event live. The Seven Network had 34 nominations, the most of any network out of the 113 in total. ABC3 got its first nomination since its launch months earlier than the ceremony, and is the first of any of the digital channels (ABC2, 7Two, GO!, SBS Two and ONE HD) to receive a nomination.

Winners and nominees
In the tables below, winners are listed first and highlighted in bold.

Gold Logie

Acting/Presenting

Most Popular Programs

Most Outstanding Programs

References

External links
 

2010
2010 television awards
2010 in Australian television
2010 awards in Australia